Microscopic View of a Telescopic Realm is the sixth studio album by the American Christian metal band Tourniquet. It was released on Metal Blade Records in 2000. The title track includes Steve Rowe of the Australian Christian metal band Mortification as a guest vocalist and the song "The Skeezix Dilemma Part II (The Improbable Testimony of the Pipsisewah)" is a sequel to "The Skeezix Dilemma" from Tourniquet's 1992 album Pathogenic Ocular Dissonance. This album marks the return to the band's neo-classical technical thrash style of metal.

Track listing

 appears on The Epic Tracks (2019)

Personnel

Tourniquet
Ted Kirkpatrick – drums, bass, guitar harmony lead ("Erratic Palpitations of the Human Spirit")
Aaron Guerra – all other rhythm and lead guitars, bass, backing vocals
Luke Easter – lead vocals

Guest musicians
Cameron Stone – cello ("The Tomb of Gilgamesh" and "The Skeezix Dilemma Part II (The Improbable Testimony of the Pipsisewah)")
Jennifer Hall – flute ("Besprinkled in Scarlet Horror" and "Immunity Vector")
Steve Rowe of Mortification – guest vocals ("Microscopic View of a Telescopic Realm")

Additional personnel
Engineered by Bill Metoyer
Produced by Bill Metoyer and Tourniquet
Photography: Jim Muth
Cover art and design: Brian J. Ames
Mixed at Frankie's Hideaway in North Hollywood, California
Mastered by Tom Baker at Precision Mastering in Hollywood, California

References

External links
Microscopic View of a Telescopic Realm at Tourniquet.net

Tourniquet (band) albums
2000 albums